Andrew Joseph Cohen (born June 2, 1968) is an American radio and television talk show host, producer, and writer.

Cohen is the host and executive producer of Bravo's late night talk show, Watch What Happens Live! He also has a pop culture channel on Sirius XM named Radio Andy. He hosts a two-hour live show with co-host John Hill twice a week. Cohen served as Bravo's executive vice president of Development and Talent until 2013. He was responsible for creating original content, developing innovative formats, and identifying new talent. Cohen also served as executive producer on the Emmy- and James Beard award–winning reality cooking competition television show, Top Chef. He continues to serve as an executive producer of the Real Housewives franchise, host of Watch What Happens Live on Bravo, host of Andy Cohen Live on SiriusXM, and hosted the revival of the television dating show Love Connection.

Early life 

Andy was born in St. Louis, Missouri, to Evelyn and Lou Cohen. He has a sister, Emily Rosenfeld. He is Jewish, with roots in Poland, Russia, and Lithuania. Cohen graduated from Clayton High School in 1986. He is a graduate of Boston University, where he received a Bachelor of Science degree in broadcast journalism. Cohen wrote for the Boston University student newspaper, The Daily Free Press. He later interned at CBS News alongside Julie Chen, who was also working as an intern.

Career 
Cohen began his career in television as an intern at CBS News. He spent 10 years at the network, eventually serving as senior producer of The Early Show, a producer for 48 Hours, and a producer for CBS This Morning. He joined the television network Trio in 2000, later becoming vice president of original programming at Bravo in 2004, when the network purchased Trio.

Cohen was a regular on Today and Morning Joe, and has co-hosted Live! with Kelly, and The View. He has made various guest appearances on other talk shows. He has made several guest appearances on television shows playing himself, such as The Comeback and Saturday Night Live. In summer 2009, Cohen began hosting a weekly midnight television talk show, Watch What Happens Live. The show was later expanded into a weeknight series.

Cohen's autobiographical memoir Most Talkative (Henry Holt and Company), released in May 2012, became a New York Times Best Seller in the hardcover, paperback, and combined nonfiction categories.

On August 15, 2013, he declined to co-host the Miss Universe pageant in Russia, due to the country's recent adoption of anti-gay laws. Before that, he hosted Miss USA 2011 and Miss USA 2012. On March 22, 2014, he portrayed Zeus in Lady Gaga's music video for "G.U.Y.".

In November 2014, Cohen published his second memoir, The Andy Cohen Diaries: A Deep Look at a Shallow Year, inspired by the similarly titled The Andy Warhol Diaries. The book spans a year of journal entries beginning in September 2013. The Andy Cohen Diaries became a Times Best Seller in the Combined Print & E-Book Nonfiction category.

On September 14, 2015, SiriusXM launched a new radio channel curated by Cohen, known as Radio Andy. The channel features shows hosted by Cohen (Andy Cohen Live, and Andy Cohen's Deep & Shallow). Cohen also hosts a series of special broadcasts for his station known as Town Halls in front of a live studio audience. The channel also features shows hosted by; Sandra Bernhard, Bevy Smith, Dan Rather, Michelle Collins, Jim Parsons, Jeff Lewis, Amy Phillips, Jonathan Alter (together with his family), John Hill, the producers of Watch What Happens Live, and the producers at World of Wonder. The channel has also produced specials including; Radio Andy Theater, a parody of the Real Housewives franchise, AC2 Live: Andy and Anderson on the Road (a behind-the-scenes show following Cohen and Anderson Cooper on their live tour), and the Love Connection Diaries (also a backstage docu-series featuring Cohen, and Love Connection producer and Radio Andy host, John Hill).

Cohen and close friend Anderson Cooper announced that they would be going on a national tour to perform their conversational stage show AC2 beginning in March 2015. The tour opened in Boston, followed by Miami Beach, Chicago and Atlanta. The idea for the show came about after Cooper interviewed Cohen about his then-latest book, The Andy Cohen Diaries, at an event at the 92nd Street Y in New York City. Since then, the two-man show has continued to tour reaching over 50 cities as of October 2018.

On December 31, 2015, Cohen hosted a one-off live edition of Hollywood Game Night (New Year's Eve Game Night), and co-hosted New Year's Eve with Carson Daly, for NBC.

In 2016, the publisher Henry Holt and Company announced it was launching the imprint Andy Cohen Books. Cohen's third memoir Superficial: More Adventures From the Andy Cohen Diaries was published in November 2016. A sequel to The Andy Cohen Diaries, the book covers diary entries for the subsequent two years. Superficial became a Times Best Seller among books written by celebrities.

In January 2017, Fox ordered a revival of Love Connection hosted by Cohen. The hour-long game show premiered on May 25. The same month, Cohen played himself on the Netflix series, Unbreakable Kimmy Schmidt. In August 2017, Fox announced that it would renew Love Connection for a second season. Later that year, Cohen succeeded Kathy Griffin as co-host of CNN's New Year's Eve coverage alongside Cooper.

In 2018, Cohen played himself on the show Riverdale as a friend of the Lodge family. He made a March 2018 appearance as a guest judge in an episode of the VH1 reality-television series RuPaul's Drag Race. In December 2018, 2019, 2020, 2021 and 2022, he again co-hosted CNN's New Year's Eve coverage with Anderson Cooper.

Personal life 
Cohen is the first openly gay host of an American late-night talk show. In December 2018, he announced he would become a father in 2019 with the help of a surrogate. His son, Ben, was born February 4, 2019. His daughter, Lucy, was born April 29, 2022.

Awards

2004, Peabody Award, 2004, as executive producer of the Trio documentary The N-Word.
2007, Multichannel News "40 Under 40" broadcasting executives.
2007, Peabody Award, as executive producer of the Bravo reality-TV competition Project Runway.
2010, appeared on the TV Guide "Power List" of talked-about individuals.
2010, Emmy Award for Outstanding Competitive Reality Series as executive producer of Top Chef
2012, GQ's "25 Best Dressed Men of the Year",
2012, chosen as one of Broadcasting & Cable's "Digital All-Stars".
2012 to 2016, listed in Out magazine's list of Most Powerful Gay People.
 2019, received the Vito Russo Award at the 30th GLAAD Media Awards.

Filmography

Television

Bibliography

See also
 Broadcast journalism
 Entertainment journalism
 LGBT culture in New York City
 List of LGBT people from New York City
 New Yorkers in journalism

References

External links 

 

Watch What Happens Live official website
Andy Cohen's blog on Bravo

1968 births
Living people
20th-century American Jews
20th-century American LGBT people
21st-century American Jews
21st-century American male actors
21st-century American male writers
21st-century American LGBT people
American bloggers
American gay actors
American gay writers
American male bloggers
American male television actors
American socialites
American television executives
American television talk show hosts
Boston University College of Communication alumni
Gay entertainers
Jewish American male actors
Jewish American writers
Late night television talk show hosts
American LGBT broadcasters
Gay Jews
Gay memoirists
LGBT people from Missouri
LGBT television producers
Male actors from St. Louis
Peabody Award winners
Primetime Emmy Award winners
Television producers from Missouri
Writers from St. Louis
Jewish American television producers